Hypsas (Ὕψας) is the classical name of two rivers in Sicily:

 The San Leone (river), also known as the Sant'Anna or Drago, near Agrigento (in antiquity Akragas)
 The Belice, near the ancient city of Selinus, on the banks of which stood the ancient city of Inycum.